Elba Center is an unincorporated community located in Knox County, Illinois.

References

Unincorporated communities in Knox County, Illinois